Natasa (Greek: Νατάσα) is the ninth album by Greek artist Natasa Theodoridou. It was released on 27 November 2007 by Sony BMG Greece and received gold certification, selling 15,000 units. The album was written entirely by Kiriakos Papadopoulos on music and Ilias Filippou on lyrics. The songs "Pali", "Den Thelo Tipota" and "Na M' Agapas" became big hits on radio stations.

Track listing

Credits
Credits adapted from liner notes.

Personnel 

 Hakan Bingolou: cümbüş (tracks: 4) || oud (tracks: 5, 11)
 Giannis Bithikotsis: baglama (tracks: 2, 7) || bouzouki (tracks: 1, 2, 4, 7, 9) || cura (tracks: 1, 2, 4, 7)
 Akis Diximos: backing vocals (tracks: 3, 4, 5, 11, 13) || second vocal (tracks: 1, 2, 6, 8, 10)
 Giorgos Galanos: programming (tracks: 10, 12)
 Andreas Giatrakos: guitar (tracks: 13) || orchestration, programming (tracks: 9, 13)
 Panagiotis Giatrakos: bass, orchestration (tracks: 9)
 Thanos Gkiouletzis: violin (tracks: 1, 4, 8)
 Antonis Gounaris: cümbüş (tracks: 6) || guitar, orchestration, programming (tracks: 2, 6, 7)
 Giannis Grigoriou: bass (tracks: 1, 2, 3, 4, 5, 7, 8, 10, 11, 12)
 Anna Ioannidou: backing vocals (tracks: 4, 5, 13)
 Manolis Karantinis: baglama (tracks: 10, 11, 12) || bouzouki (tracks: 8, 10, 11, 12)
 Katerina Kiriakou: backing vocals (tracks: 4, 5, 13)
 Zacharias Maragkos: guitar (tracks: 3, 5, 11)
 Andreas Mouzakis: drums (tracks: 1, 2, 3, 4, 5, 6, 7, 8, 10, 11, 12)
 Charis Papadopoulos: keyboards (tracks: 13)
 Kiriakos Papadopoulos: accordion (tracks: 12) || keyboards (tracks: 1, 2, 3, 4, 5, 6, 7, 8, 10, 11, 12) || orchestration (tracks: 1, 3, 4, 5, 8, 10, 11, 12) || programming (tracks: 1, 3, 4, 5, 8, 10, 11)
 Stavros Pazarentsis: clarinet (tracks: 3, 5, 13) || ney (tracks: 3, 5, 6, 13)
 Christos Pertsinidis: guitar (tracks: 1, 4, 8, 10, 12)
 Grigoris Petrakos: guitar (tracks: 3, 13)
 Manolis Platakis: guitar (tracks: 9)
 Thanasis Rokas: violin (tracks: 3, 5)
 Andreas Siderakis: drums (tracks: 9)
 Nikos Stavropoulos: bouzouki, cura (tracks: 10)
 Andreas Trapalis: violin (tracks: 9)

Production 

 Vasilis Bouloubasis: hair styling
 Giannis Doulamis: executive producer
 Thodoris Ikonomou (Sofita studio): sound engineer
 Giannis Ioannidis (D.P.H.): mastering
 Giorgos Marketakis: make up
 Tzortzia Michalopoulou: art direction
 Lefteris Neromiliotis (Sofita studio): mix engineer, sound engineer
 Thodoris Psiachos: photographer
 Dimitris Rekouniotis: artwork
 Giorgos Segredakis: styling
 Vasilis Tsouparopoulos: illustration

References

Natasa Theodoridou albums
Greek-language albums
2007 albums
Sony Music Greece albums